William Alexander Dickson (July 20, 1861 – February 25, 1940) was a U.S. Representative from Mississippi.

Born in Centreville, Mississippi, Dickson attended private and public schools, Pleasant Grove School, Centenary College, Jackson, Louisiana, and Vanderbilt University, Nashville, Tennessee. He studied law but did not practice it, instead engaging in agricultural pursuits. Dickson worked as a supervisor from 1886 to 1888, before serving as a member of the state house of representatives from 1887 to 1893. Working as the school commissioner of Wilkinson County, he served as member of the board of trustees of the Agricultural and Mechanical College, Starkville, Mississippi, and of Edward Magehee College, Woodville, Mississippi, for five years.

Dickson was elected as a Democrat to the Sixty-first and Sixty-second Congresses (March 4, 1909 – March 3, 1913).

Dickson was elected supervisor of the third district of Wilkinson County and superintendent of its highways in 1927. He died in Centreville, Mississippi, February 25, 1940, and was interred in Oaklawn Cemetery.

References

1861 births
1940 deaths
People from Centreville, Mississippi
Democratic Party members of the Mississippi House of Representatives
Democratic Party members of the United States House of Representatives from Mississippi